M'Bareck is a Mauritanian surname. Notable people with the name include:
 Mohamed M'Bareck (born 1995), Mauritanian footballer
 Sghair Ould M'Bareck (born 1954), Mauritanian politician

References 

Surnames of Mauritanian origin